Yusif Mammadov (born 24 January 1950) is an Azerbaijani academic.

Life

Yusif Mammadov was born in village of Dastagird, region of Sisyan of Western Azerbaijan on 24 January 1950. He graduated from secondary school with a gold medal in 1966 and entered the mechanics and mathematics faculty of Azerbaijan State University, he was hold in department of equations of mathematical physics of Azerbaijan State University with appointment in 1971 after he graduated from university with excellent marks and he rose to professor duty from assistant this department. He worked as the first pro-rector of Baku State University in 2000-2004, active member of Azerbaijan National Academy of Sciences (2017).

 He defensed a nomination in 1974 and a thesis in 1990.
 He was awarded honorary title of "Honored Scientist" with president of Azerbaijan Haydar Aliyev's order in 2000.
 He was selected correspondent member of NASA in 2001.
 He is mathematician, he is famous expert in equations of mathematical physics and differential. He is author of scientific work more than 100. Most of his works published in influential journals of foreign countries.
 He trained 10 candidate of science, 1 doctor of science.
 He is member of Azerbaijan National Committee of ethics of scientific knowledge and technologies of UNESCO.
 He is chairman of expert council in mathematics and mechanics of Higher Attestation Commission under the President of the Republic of Azerbaijan.
 He worked as a rector of Azerbaijan State Pedagogical University from 21 April 2006 till 6 May 2016.
 He was appointed consultant of the Ministry of Education of Azerbaijan Republic since 7 May 2016.

References

1950 births
Academic staff of Azerbaijan Technical University
Living people
Academic staff of Azerbaijan State Pedagogical University